Clastopus is a genus of flowering plants belonging to the family Brassicaceae.

Its native range is Iraq to Iran.

Species:

Clastopus erubescens 
Clastopus purpureus 
Clastopus vestitus

References

Brassicaceae
Brassicaceae genera